William Bayne (1858–1922) was a writer and a lecturer at Dundee Training College. He was born on 13 April 1858 at Lawhead, Cameron in Fife. His father was Thomas Bayne, a shoemaker, and his mother Ann Robertson. He died unmarried at Radernie, Cameron  on 17 November 1922, aged 64.

Publications 
 James Thomson, Edinburgh: Oliphant, Anderson and Ferrier, 1898, ("Famous Scots Series").
 Poems, by James Thomson, ed. by William Bayne, London : Walter Scott Publishing Co., [1900], (Series: The Canterbury poets).
 Sir David Wilkie R. A., (Illustrated with twenty plates, etc.), London : Walter Scott Publishing Co., 1903, (Series: The makers of British art).

Sources 
 Births and deaths information available at the General Register Office for Scotland, Scotlands People Centre in Edinburgh, and also at http://scotlandspeople.gov.uk
 British Library catalogue: http://www.bl.uk
 http://openlibrary.org
 http://worldcat.org

References

1858 births
1922 deaths
Writers from Fife
Scottish biographers
Scottish non-fiction writers
Scottish art historians